Daphne Karagianis (born August 31, 1985) is an American racing cyclist, who currently rides for American UCI Continental team DNA Pro Cycling.

References

External links
 

1985 births
Living people
American female cyclists
Place of birth missing (living people)
21st-century American women